Playing Truant (Swedish: Skolka skolan) is a 1949 Swedish comedy film directed by Schamyl Bauman and starring Sickan Carlsson, Gunnar Björnstrand and Olof Winnerstrand. It was shot at the Centrumateljéerna Studios in Stockholm and on location in the city. The film's sets were designed by the art director Arthur Spjuth.

Cast
 Sickan Carlsson as Margareta Carlson-Kronberg
 Gunnar Björnstrand as 	Bertil Kronberg
 Olof Winnerstrand as Paulus Bomvall
 Viveca Serlachius as 	Gertrud 'Truttan' Karlberg
 Dagmar Ebbesen as 	Hilda
 Gösta Cederlund as 	Oskar Carlsson
 Gull Natorp as 	Mrs. Agda Carlsson
 Anne-Margrethe Björlin as 	Helene Berglöf
 Naima Wifstrand as Dehlin
 Jan Molander as	Hjalmar Hammarlund
 Mimi Pollak as Märta Hoffman
 Maud Söderlund as 	Alice
 Edvin Adolphson as Man in the Restaurant 
 Harriet Andersson as 	School Girl in Stockholm 
 Wiktor Andersson as 	Wardrobist 
 Olga Appellöf as 	Teacher in Dream 
 Ingrid Björk as 	Karla 
 John Botvid as 	Restaurant Guest 
 Kerstin 'Kicki' Bratt as 	School Girl in Enköping 
 Lena Brogren as 	School Girl in Stockholm 
 Erland Colliander as Teacher
 Eivor Engelbrektsson as 	Gymnastics Teacher 
 Sven-Eric Gamble as 	Man Delivering Flowers 
 Sten Hedlund as 	Teacher 
 Douglas Håge as 	Bum 
 Ivar Kåge as 	Andrén 
 Signe Lundberg-Settergren asTeacher 
 Nils Ohlin as Train Passenger 
 Gunvor Pontén as School Girl in Enköping
 Sif Ruud as 	Miss Hoffman's Friend in Uppsala 
 Öllegård Wellton as 	School Girl in Enköping 
 Torsten Winge as 	Berglöf

References

Bibliography 
 Per Olov Qvist & Peter von Bagh. Guide to the Cinema of Sweden and Finland. Greenwood Publishing Group, 2000.

External links 
 

1949 films
1949 comedy films
Swedish comedy films
1940s Swedish-language films
Films directed by Schamyl Bauman
1940s Swedish films